Josselyn Van Tyne (11 May 1902, Philadelphia – 30 January 1957, Ann Arbor) was an American ornithologist and museum curator of birds.

A son of the historian Claude H. Van Tyne, Josselyn Van Tyne received his A.B. from Harvard University in 1925 and his Ph.D. in 1928 from the University of Michigan at Ann Arbor. He became Assistant Curator of Birds at the U. of Michigan's Museum of Zoology and in 1931 Curator of Birds, a position he held until his death; his successor as the Museum's Curator of Birds was Harrison B. Tordoff. In 1930 Van Tyne became an instructor in the U. of Michigan's Department of Zoology, then assistant professor, associate professor, and finally professor in 1953.

Van Tyne was editor of the Wilson Bulletin from 1939 to 1948 and the president of the Wilson Ornithological Society from 1935 to 1937. In 1936 he was elected a Fellow of the American Ornithologists' Union and served as the Union's President from 1950 to 1953.

In 1933 he married Helen Belfield Bates (1896–1980), a daughter of Henry Moore Bates.

Selected works

with Outram Bangs: 
with Outram Bangs: 
 
 
with George M. Sutton: 
 
with R. T. Hatt; L. C. Stuart; C. H. Pope; A. B. Grobman: 
with William Holland Drury, Jr.:  (See Bylot Island.)
with Dale A. Zimmerman: 
with Andrew J. Berger:

See also 
 Ornithologist Amelia Laskey, one of his scientific collaborators.

References

1902 births
1957 deaths
American ornithologists
American curators
American women curators
Harvard University alumni
University of Michigan alumni
University of Michigan faculty
20th-century American zoologists
20th-century American women scientists